Bruna Kajiya (born 25 February 1987) is a Brazilian professional kiteboarder. She is a six-time Vice World Champion and a three-time World Champion Freestyle (2009, 2016, and 2017) in the World Kiteboarding League (WKL). In 2018, the WKL was replaced by the Global Kitesports Association (GKA) which became the official Kite Surfing World Title organization. In 2019, Bruna was the GKA Vice World Freestyle Champion, giving her her sixth Vice World  Championship Title. In 2016, Bruna was the first woman to land a "Backside 315", a trick that combines a 540 degree rotation and double handle-pass.

Bruna is originally from Ilhabela where she competed as a swimmer from an early age, earning the nickname "Little Fish." Following a surfing accident, she sought out a new sport and discovered wakestyle kiteboarding while studying in Maui.

Bruna is sponsored by Red Bull, Mystic and North Kiteboarding.

References

External links 
 Bruna Kajiya Official Page
 Red Bull Athlete Page: Bruna Kajiya
 Mystic Team Riders: Bruna Kajiya

1987 births
Female kitesurfers
Living people